Marco Schuster (born 10 October 1995) is a German professional footballer who plays as a midfielder for SC Paderborn.

Career
Schuster made his debut in the 3. Liga for Waldhof Mannheim on 21 July 2019, starting in the home match against Chemnitzer FC which finished as a 1–1 draw.

References

External links
 
 Profile at kicker.de

1995 births
Living people
People from Donau-Ries
Sportspeople from Swabia (Bavaria)
Footballers from Bavaria
German footballers
Association football midfielders
FC Augsburg II players
FC Augsburg players
SV Waldhof Mannheim players
SC Paderborn 07 players
2. Bundesliga players
3. Liga players
Regionalliga players